The 2003 Speedway World Cup (SWC) was the 3rd FIM Speedway World Cup season. The Final took place on 9 August 2003 in Vojens, Denmark. The tournament was won by Sweden (62 pts) and they beat Australia (57 points), host team Denmark (53 pts) and Poland (49 pts), Great Britain (44 pts) in the Final.

Qualification 

 Qualifying round
 2003-05-11
  Daugavpils, Latvijas Spidveja Centrs

Venues 
Three cities were selected to host SWC finals events:

Qualifying round

Holsted (1) 

 Event 1
 2003-08-03
  Holsted

Outrup (2) 

 Event 2
 2003-08-04
  Outrup
 Latvia team (3rd in Qualifying round) was replaced by Italy (4th in Qualifying round)

Holsted (3) 

 Event 3
 2003-08-05
  Holsted

Race-off 

 Race-Off
 2003-08-07
  Outrup

Final 

 The Final
 2003-08-09
  Vojens

References

See also 
2003 Speedway Grand Prix

 
2003
World T